Sainte-Cécile may refer to:

Sainte Cécile de Rome, Catolic Sainte

 Sainte-Cécile, Indre, a commune in the Indre department
 Sainte-Cécile, Manche, a commune in the Manche department
 Sainte-Cécile, Saône-et-Loire, a commune in the Saône-et-Loire department
 Sainte-Cécile, Vendée, a commune in the Vendée department

 Sainte-Cécile, New Brunswick, a community in Canada
 Ste. Cecile, a local service district containing the community